Haw Par Villa is a theme park located along Pasir Panjang Road in Singapore. The park contains over 1,000 statues and 150 giant dioramas depicting scenes from Chinese mythology, folklore, legends, history, and illustrations of various aspects of Confucianism. During the 1970s and 1980s, the park was a major local attraction; it is estimated that the park then welcomed at least 1 million annual visitors, and is considered as part of Singapore's cultural heritage. As of 2018, under the park operator, Journeys, efforts to revitalise the park are ongoing with the holding of themed events and the planning and construction of ancillary museums.

History
Burmese-Chinese brothers Aw Boon Haw and Aw Boon Par, the developers of Tiger Balm, moved their business from Burma to Singapore in 1926. The site, which is in front of a small hill and faces the Singapore Strait, was deemed suitable based on considerations of feng shui, and was purchased in 1935. On the site, a Har Par Villa was being built for the next two years. The villa was designed by Ho Kwong Yew and was of Art Deco architecture. The villa was bombed by the Japanese during the World War II, and was subsequently occupied by them. After the war ended, the villa was demolished. Between 1937 and his death in 1954 (when the garden was declared public property, and turned into a park), Boon Haw commissioned statues and dioramas in the garden that served to teach traditional Chinese values.In the 1950s and 1960s, before the advent of television and shopping malls, the park was a popular recreational destination for Singaporean families. Many Singaporean adults, in a 1995 survey, reported memories of visiting the park as a child and learning about Chinese folk history and morality.In the 1980s, in a bid to restore Singapore's "oriental mystique", Singapore Tourism Board saw to the redevelopment of the park (along with Chinatown and Little India). In 1986, the International Theme Parks Pte Ltd, announced an investment of $30 million to modernise the themed park. This company was a joint venture formed by Fraser & Neave and Times Publishing, and had invested in the latest animatronics and technology to enhance the attractions in the hope to create an 'oriental Disneyland', a theme park meeting Western technology with Eastern mythology.

In 1988, Singapore Tourism Board took charge of the Tiger Balm Gardens and renamed it "Haw Par Villa Dragon World". The Haw Par in the park's name is based on the Aw brothers' personal names—Haw and Par, which mean "tiger" and "leopard" respectively. The dioramas and statues were restored, while plays, acrobatic displays, and puppet shows were organised and held there. The management imposed entrance fees but the high fees discouraged visitors, so the management incurred a loss of S$31.5 million over 10 years. The park management made a profit during its first year of operations after renovations in 1994, broke even in 1995, but started incurring losses over the next three years and was forced to provide free entries in 1998. In March 2001, the Singapore Tourism Board renamed it "Tiger Balm Gardens". The park is now open every day from 9 am to 10 pm (with last entry at 9:30 pm) and admission is free. The Hell's Museum requires an admission fee of SGD$18 for adults and SGD$10 for children.

Between March 2006 and March 2012, the S$7.8 million Hua Song Museum, which focused on the Chinese diaspora, operated within the park.

In 2014, artists Chun Kai Qun, Chun Kaifeng and Elizabeth Gan, under the curatorial platform Latent Spaces, staged four exhibitions in the theme park's unused spaces. Their first exhibition, Nameless Forms, featured the works by the Chun twins, Darren Tesar, Sai Hua Kuan and collective Yunrubin, which respond to the place's defunct exhibition halls, idle pavilions and the materials that were left behind.

In October 2020, Haw Par Villa was closed for renovations and reopened on 1 July 2021. It was originally to be reopened on 31 March 2021 but was delayed due to park operator, Journeys, needed more time to “further enhance its offerings”

Attractions
The best-known attraction in Haw Par Villa is the Ten Courts of Hell, which features gruesome depictions of Hell in Chinese mythology and Buddhism. This attraction used to be set inside a 60-metre long trail of a Chinese dragon but the dragon has been demolished, so the attraction is now covered by grey stone walls. After closure for renovations in 2020, the attraction was upgraded to be fully air-conditioned and the centerpiece of a 3,800 sqm Hell's Museum complex. While the park reopened in July 2021, the attraction reopened on 28 October.

Other major attractions include dioramas of scenes from Journey to the West, Fengshen Bang, The Twenty-four Filial Exemplars, Legend of the White Snake, Romance of the Three Kingdoms; statues of mythological figures such as the Laughing Buddha and Guanyin, and historical personages such as Jiang Ziya, Su Wu and Lin Zexu; the 12 animals in the Chinese zodiac, and others. There are also monuments dedicated to the Aw brothers and their parents.

Contemporary reception and outlook
In a 2014 study which reviewed 25 tourist guidebooks on Singapore, it was found that only the authors of one book chose to cover the park in detail. The study noted low tourist interest on the Internet, and low tourist foot traffic at the park. The study's authors also corroborated online travel reviews that some of the statues were in disrepair, and the park is ill-posed to compete with Singapore's newer tourist attractions. Haw Par Villa is, the authors note, "a treasured past, although one in danger of fading away with newer generations of tourists".

Public transportation
The Circle line station, Haw Par Villa MRT station, located next to it, opened on 8 October 2011 along with the rest of Stage 5 of the Circle line.

See also
Tiger Balm Garden (Hong Kong)
Sakya Muni Buddha Gaya Temple

References

External links

Haw Par Villa official website
Haw Par Villa at Passion Made Possible
Haw Par Villa History and Guide

1937 establishments in Singapore
Amusement parks in Singapore
Queenstown, Singapore
Visionary environments
Aw family